After a year of absence, the twenty-fourth edition of Baseball's Caribbean Series (12th edition of the second stage) finally took place in 1982. It was held from February 4 through February 9 with the champions teams from Dominican Republic, Leones del Escogido; Mexico, Naranjeros de Hermosillo; Puerto Rico, Leones de Ponce and Venezuela, Leones del Caracas. The format consisted of 12 games, each team facing the other teams twice. The games were played at Héctor Espino Stadium in Hermosillo, Mexico, which boosted capacity to 16.000 seats.

Summary
The Venezuelan team, with Alfonso (Chico) Carrasquel at the helm, won the championship title with a 5–1 record. The Leones del Caracas were led by catcher and Series MVP Baudilio (Bo) Díaz (.412 BA, two home runs, five RBI, .500 OBP, .765 SLG), center fielder Tony Armas (.375, six RBI) and LF Luis Salazar (six runs, four stolen bases). Their best pitcher was Luis Leal, who posted a 2–0 record with a 2.08 ERA and 10 strikeouts in 13.0 innings of work. Behind him were Bud Black (1-0, 1.29), Dennis Burtt (1-0, one save, seven SO in 10⅔ innings) and Tom Dixon (nine scoreless innings in Game 7). Venezuela also featured infielders Andrés Galarraga (1B),  Danny Garcia (1B), Steve Sax (2B), Ron Gardenhire (SS) and Leonardo Hernández (3B), as well as pitchers Joe Cowley and Luis Peñalver, among others. 

Puerto Rico was managed by Ed Nottle and ended second with a 3–3 mark. Ponce had no undefeated starters other than Edwin Núñez, who handed the Venezuelans only defeat, pitching a six-hit, one run complete game. Willie Hernández (1-1) and John Butcher (1-1) collected the other two wins. Other roster members included 2B Dickie Thon and outfielders Chili Davis, José Cruz and Candy Maldonado.

The highly favored Leones del Escogido, who won their second consecutive Dominican League title (eight since 1951), posted a disappointing record of 2-4--good enough to tie Mexico in third place. Despite Felipe Alou's best efforts at managing them, the Dominicans suffered both offensively and defensively, committing 12 costly errors and being outscored by their opponents 20-14. The pitching staff, led by Pascual Pérez (1-1),  Elías Sosa (1-0) and Rick Mahler (0-1), collected a solid 3.24 ERA. In contrast, position players such as Tony Peña, Clint Hurdle, Alfredo Griffin, Julio Franco and Carmen Castillo combined for a .223 average with just two home runs.

Hermosillo was managed by Tom Harmon. The two Mexican victories came at the expense of Puerto Rico, 14–0 and 1–0, behind strong pitching efforts by rookie Fernando Valenzuela and veteran Manuel Ibarra with the help of a bullpen headed by Marty Decker. Notable Mexican legends such as slugger Héctor Espino, SS Mario Mendoza, P Vicente Romo and C Alex Treviño joined the team. Also in the roster were LF Dan Gladden, RF Jerry Hairston, Sr., 3B Junior Moore and 2B Wayne Tolleson.

Final standings

Scoreboards

Game 1, February 4

Game 2, February 4

Game 3, February 5

Game 4, February 5

Game 5, February 6

Game 6, February 6

Game 7, February 7

Game 8, February 7

Game 9, February 8

Game 10, February 8

Game 11, February 9

Game 12, February 9

See also
Ballplayers who have played in the Series

Sources
Antero Núñez, José. Series del Caribe. Jefferson, Caracas, Venezuela: Impresos Urbina, C.A., 1987.
Gutiérrez, Daniel. Enciclopedia del Béisbol en Venezuela – 1895–2006 . Caracas, Venezuela: Impresión Arte, C.A., 2007.

External links
Official site
Latino Baseball
Series del Caribe, Las (Spanish)
 
  
  

Caribbean Series
Caribbean Series
International baseball competitions hosted by Mexico
1982 in Mexican sports
Sport in Hermosillo
1982 in Caribbean sport
Caribbean Series